The China-DPRK Treaty on Friendship, Cooperation and Mutual Assistance, or The Sino-North Korean Mutual Aid and Cooperation Friendship Treaty is a treaty signed on 11 July 1961 between North Korea and China. The treaty is currently the only defense treaty either China or North Korea have with any nation.

Background
After the 1961 May 16 Coup, the new South Korean leader Park Chung-hee urged for an increase in military spending and for action to be taken against North Korea. The North Korean leadership feared a South Korean invasion and turned to the Soviet Union and China for support.

Signing
The treaty was signed in Beijing and came into effect on 10 September of the same year.  Premier of the People's Republic of China Zhou Enlai and Prime Minister of North Korea Kim Il-sung signed for their respective countries. The treaty generally promoted peaceful cooperation in the areas of culture, economics, technology and other social benefits between the two nations.  Specifically, Article 2 of the treaty declares the two nations undertake all necessary measures to oppose any country or coalition of countries that might attack either nation.

In accordance with the Article 7, the Treaty remains in force unless agreement is reached on its amendment or termination.

Kim Il-sung arrived in Beijing in 1961 to sign the treaty just a few days after signing the North Korean-Soviet Mutual Aid and Cooperation Friendship Treaty.  The Soviet treaty however has not been in effect since the 1990s with only a revised "consultation" treaty being re-adopted in 1999.

See also
Sino-Soviet relations from 1969–1991 
China–North Korea relations
Sino-Soviet Treaty of Friendship, Alliance and Mutual Assistance

References

External links 

 Full text of the treaty in English

1961 in China
1961 in North Korea
Bilateral treaties of China
China–North Korea relations
Cold War alliances and military strategy
Cold War treaties
Military alliances involving China
Military alliances involving North Korea
Treaties concluded in 1961
Treaties entered into force in 1961
Treaties of the People's Republic of China